Gordon Ferguson McPhate (born 1 June 1950) is an Anglican priest, who was Dean of Chester from 2002 to 2017.

Biography
McPhate was educated at the University of Aberdeen, Fitzwilliam College, Cambridge, the University of Surrey and the University of Edinburgh. 

After a spell as a tutor in Physiology at Clare College, he was ordained in 1979.  
He later held lectureships at Guy’s Hospital and the University of St Andrews. He was an honorary curate at Sanderstead, then an honorary Minor Canon at Southwark Cathedral and an honorary chaplain at St Andrews, before his appointment to the Deanery. He retired  from full-time ministry on 30 September 2017.

References

1950 births
Living people
Alumni of the University of Aberdeen
Alumni of Fitzwilliam College, Cambridge
Alumni of the University of Surrey
Alumni of the University of Edinburgh
Fellows of Clare College, Cambridge
Academics of King's College London
Academics of the University of St Andrews
Deans of Chester